Qiongzhong Li and Miao Autonomous County is an autonomous county in Hainan, China. It is one of 6 autonomous  counties of the upper highlands of Hainan. Its postal code is 572900, and in 1999 its population was 196,581 people, largely made up of the Li people and the Miao people.

Populated places
Yinggen

Climate

See also
 List of administrative divisions of Hainan

References

 
 Official website

External links
 

 
County-level divisions of Hainan
Li autonomous counties
Miao autonomous counties